1991–92 Albanian Cup was the fortieth season of Albania's annual cup competition. It began in August 1991 with the First Round and ended in May 1992 with the Final match. The winners of the competition qualified for the 1992-93 first round of the UEFA Cup. Partizani were the defending champions, having won their twelfth Albanian Cup last season. The cup was won by Elbasani.

The first round was played in a single round-robin matches within 8 qualifying groups. The other rounds were played in a one-legged format similar to those of European competitions. If the number of goals was equal, the match was decided by extra time and a penalty shootout, if necessary.

First round
Games were played on August & September 1991

Group 1

Group 2

Group 3

Group 4

Group 5

Group 6

Group 7

Group 8

Second round
All sixteen teams of the 1990–91 Superliga and First Division entered in this round. First and second legs were played in January 1992.

|}

Quarter-finals
In this round entered the 8 winners from the previous round.

|}

Semi-finals
In this round entered the four winners from the previous round.

|}

Final

References

 Calcio Mondiale Web

External links
 Official website 

Cup
1991–92 domestic association football cups
1991-92